Body of War is a 2007 documentary film about Iraq War veteran Tomas Young. Bill Moyers Journal featured a one-hour special about Body of War including interviews with filmmakers Ellen Spiro and Phil Donahue.

Summary
Shocked by the September 11 attacks Tomas Young wants to defend his country and subsequently he joins the United States Armed Forces. As a soldier he is sent to Iraq and soon after his arrival a marksman's bullet maims him. Intercut with his personal story is footage from Congressional proceedings in Washington, D.C. which led to this controversial war.

Accolades 
Shortlisted for an Oscar nomination from the Academy of Motion Picture Arts and Sciences.
Best Documentary (National Board of Review of Motion Pictures)
People's Choice Award at the Toronto International Film Festival.
Audience Award for Best Documentary at the Hamptons International Film Festival.

Critical reception 
Time assessed the documentary as "superb" and "very moving". The Washington Post considered the documentary well-told, upsetting and "ferocious". The Hollywood Reporter certified "Body of War" was special among other antiwar documentaries for its "identification" with one particular human fate. Moving Pictures agreed the film "secures its strength" by that. The Los Angeles Times described this narrative as a "heartbreaking account" and moreover spoke of a strong indictment of "the tactical politics that led to the invasion". The Boston Globe and The Kansas City Star also called it "heartbreaking". The Toronto Star appreciated protagonist Tomas Young as a "fascinating, charismatic character". The Philadelphia Inquirer stated Young's filmic portrait was a "complex profile in courage". The Austin Chronicle said "Body of War" was "affecting" and a "cinematic argument against the war". TV Guide resumed it was a "powerful film".

Media coverage 
Moyers, Bill. Bill Moyers Journal .   BODY OF WAR | PBS pbs.org/moyers 2008-03-21. Retrieved on 2008-3-29.
Zeitchik, Steven.   Donahue's 'Body' Builds Buzz:  Talkshow Icon's Documentary Sparks Interest.  Variety.  2007-7-8.  Retrieved on 2007-7-12.
Goodman, Amy. 'Democracy Now' interview with Phil Donahue and Ellen Spiro Democracy Now. 2008-3-25.
Gillette, Felix.   Phil Donahue Strikes Back. The New York Observer.   2007-6-19. Retrieved on 2007-6-25.
Donahue, Phil.   Body of War. The Huffington Post.  2007-6-17. Retrieved on 2007-6-25.
Kluger, Bruce. Films No Longer Wait for History. USA Today. 2007-10-31.
Friedman, Roger.   Phil Donahue Makes Anti-War Film. FoxNews.com.  2006-11-27.  Retrieved on 2007-6-25.
Celizic, Mike. Phil Donahue Unveils Documentary on Wounded GI Today. MSNBC.com. 2008-4-1.
Next on Phil Donahue: Body of War  New York Daily News. 2008-4-5.
Silverman, Jason. Donahue Tackles Iraq in Body of War. Wired.
Niles Folsom, Chandra.   So What Do You Do, Phil Donahue? MediaBistro.com.  2007-6-6.  Retrieved on 2007-6-25.
Powers, Ann. A War Vet's Unlikely Seat in the Spotlight Los Angeles Times. 2008-4-20.
Newman, Laura. Interview: Ellen Spiro (co-director for Body of War) Ioncinema.com. 2008-4-18.
Priesmeyer, Molly. Tomas Young of Body of War Continues his Fight. Minnesota Monitor. 2008-5-16.
Frehsee, Nicole. Body of War Hero Talks Eddie Vedder, SXSW Premiere Rolling Stone. 2008-3-6.

Soundtrack

The double-CD compilation of songs curated by Iraq war veteran Tomas Young, was released by Sire Records on March 18, 2008 — two days before the fifth anniversary of the United States' invasion of Iraq.
A Body of War music site was created to provide special features and related links.

Track listing

Disc one
Brendan James – "Hero's Song"
Lupe Fiasco – "American Terrorist" (Fiasco, Prolyfic, Armando Corea) – 4:40
Michael Franti & Spearhead – "Light Up Ya Lighter" (Franti, Itiene) – 4:57
Rage Against the Machine – "Guerrilla Radio" – 3:26
Public Enemy – "Son of a Bush" – 5:52
Serj Tankian – "Empty Walls" (Tankian) – 3:49
Bad Religion – "Let Them Eat War" (Brian Baker, Jay Bentley, Sage Francis, Brett Gurewitz, Brooks Wackerman) – 2:57
Against Me! – "White People for Peace" (Tom Gabel) – 3:33
The Bouncing Souls – "Letter from Iraq" (The Bouncing Souls, Garett Reppenhagen) – 2:57
Dilated Peoples – "War" (Questlove)
Rx Bandits – "Overcome (The Recapitulation)" – 3:46
No Use for a Name – "Fields of Agony" – 2:24
Talib Kweli & Cornel West – "Bushonomics"
Immortal Technique – "The 4th Branch" – 5:20
System of a Down – "B.Y.O.B." (Daron Malakian, Casey Chaos, Serj Tankian) – 4:17
Eddie Vedder & Ben Harper – "No More" [Live]

Disc two
Bruce Springsteen – "Devils & Dust" (Springsteen) – 4:58
Pearl Jam – "Masters of War" [Live] (Bob Dylan)
Bright Eyes – "When the President Talks to God" (Conor Oberst) – 2:46
John Lennon – "Gimme Some Truth" (Lennon) – 3:16
Neil Young – "The Restless Consumer"
The Nightwatchman – "Battle Hymns"
Kimya Dawson – "Anthrax"
Blow Up Hollywood – "WMD"
David Ford – "State of the Union" (Ford)
Tori Amos – "Yo George" (Amos) – 1:25
Laura Cantrell – "Love Vigilantes"
Ben Harper – "Black Rain" (Ben Harper/Jason Yates) 
Roger Waters – "To Kill the Child"
Tom Waits – "Day After Tomorrow" (Kathleen Brennan, Waits)

References

External links 
Official site

Body of War music site

2007 films
American documentary films
Documentary films about the Iraq War
Opposition to the Iraq War
Iraq War casualties
Documentary films about veterans
Documentary films about people with disability
2007 documentary films
Films directed by Ellen Spiro
2000s English-language films
2000s American films